Traffic Judge (1952–1972) was an American Thoroughbred racehorse. He was owned by Clifford Mooers, proprietor of Walnut Springs Farm in Lexington, Kentucky, and trained by future U.S. Racing Hall of Fame inductee, Woody Stephens. On November 13, 1956 Clifford Mooers died of a heart attack at New York City's LaGuardia Airport while en route to see Traffic Judge compete in the Narragansett Special. His estate auctioned the horse and on December 24 he was purchased for $362,345.70  by Louis P. Doherty, owner of The Stallion Station on Muir Station Road in Lexington, Kentucky. Traffic Judge's race conditioning was then taken over by another Hall of Fame inductee, James W. Maloney.

Traffic Judge showed some promise at age two when he won the 1954 Prairie State Stakes at Washington Park Race Track in Chicago. In the 1955 U.S. Triple Crown series, Traffic Judge did not run in the Kentucky Derby or Belmont Stakes but did compete in the Preakness Stakes and finished third to winner Nashua. Traffic Judge did however win several important races that year including the Ohio Derby the Ventnor Turf Handicap and the Jerome Handicap for three-year-olds as well as the Woodward Stakes, a major weight-for-age race against older horses.

Traffic Judge won the Laurel Turf Cup Handicap at age four and at age five won two major races for older horses, the Metropolitan and Suburban Handicaps.

Retired to stud, Traffic Judge was the sire of Traffic, the 1963 Hopeful Stakes winner in the United States who went on to stand at stud in France where he was the 1971 Leading sire. Other of Traffic Judge's progeny who were successful in racing included multiple stakes winners Green Ticket (1959), Traffic Mark (1966), Judgeable (1969) and Grade 1 winner Court Ruling (1970). In addition, he sired Best In Show (1965) who was voted Kentucky Broodmare of the Year in 1982.

Traffic Judge died at age twenty in 1972 and was buried at The Stallion Station now known as 505 Farm.

Pedigree

References

External links
 Traffic Judge's pedigree and partial racing stats

1952 racehorse births
1972 racehorse deaths
Racehorses bred in the United States
Racehorses trained in the United States
Thoroughbred family 3-n